Seticosta is a genus of moths belonging to the family Tortricidae.

Species
Seticosta aeolozona Meyrick, 1926
Seticosta albicentra  Razowski & Wojtusiak, 2009
Seticosta arachnogramma  Meyrick, 1926
Seticosta argentichroa  Razowski & Pelz, 2004
Seticosta ariadnae  Razowski & Pelz, 2004
Seticosta cerussograpta  Razowski, 1999
Seticosta charagma  Razowski & Becker, 1999
Seticosta chlorothicta  Razowski & Pelz, 2004
Seticosta cigcligrapha  Razowski & Pelz, 2004
Seticosta concava  Razowski & Wojtusiak, 2009
Seticosta constricta  Razowski & Wojtusiak, 2010
Seticosta coquimbana  Razowski & Pelz, 2010
Seticosta droserana  Razowski & Wojtusiak, 2009
Seticosta egregia  Razowski & Pelz, 2004 
Seticosta elbaho Razowski & Wojtusiak, 2013
Seticosta homosacta  Meyrick, 1930 
Seticosta marcapatae  Razowski & Wojtusiak, 2010
Seticosta multifidana  Zeller, 1877
Seticosta niveonigra  Razowski & Wojtusiak, 2006
Seticosta paranica  Razowski & Becker, 1999
Seticosta phrixotricha  Razowski & Pelz, 2004
Seticosta punctum  Razowski & Becker, 1999
Seticosta retearia  Razowski & Pelz, 2004
Seticosta rubicola  Brown & Nishida, 2003
Seticosta sagmatica  Meyrick, 1912
Seticosta senecta  Razowski & Becker, 1999
Seticosta subariadnae  Razowski & Wojtusiak, 2009
Seticosta szeptyckii  Razowski & Wojtusiak, 2009
Seticosta tambomachaya  Razowski, 1988
Seticosta tholeraula  Meyrick, 1912
Seticosta tinga  Razowski & Wojtusiak, 2010
Seticosta transtillana  Razowski & Wojtusiak, 2010
Seticosta triangulifera  Razowski & Pelz, 2004
Seticosta tridens  Razowski, 1988
Seticosta versabilis  Meyrick, 1926

Status unknown
Seticosta mirana (Felder & Rogenhofer, 1875)

References

 , 2005: World Catalogue of Insects volume 5 Tortricidae.
 , 2004: Remarks on Seticosta Razowski, with descriptions of seven new species from Ecuador (Lepidoptera: Tortricidae). Shilap Revista de Lepidopterologica 32(127): 183-194.
  2010: Tortricidae from Chile (Lepidoptera: Tortricidae). Shilap Revista de Lepidopterologia 38 (149): 5-55.
 , 2006: Tortricidae from Venezuela (Lepidoptera: Tortricidae). Shilap Revista de Lepidopterologia 34 133): 35-79 
 , 2009: Tortricidae (Lepidoptera) from the mountains of Ecuador and remarks on their geographical distribution. Part IV. Eastern Cordillera. Acta Zoologica Cracoviensia 51B (1-2): 119-187. doi:10.3409/azc.52b_1-2.119-187. Full article: .
 , 2010: Tortricidae (Lepidoptera) from Peru. Acta Zoologica Cracoviensia 53B (1-2): 73-159. . Full article: .

External links
tortricidae.com

 
Euliini
Tortricidae genera
Taxa named by Józef Razowski